Dolenci is a village in the Municipality of Šalovci in the Prekmurje region of Slovenia, on the border with Hungary.

The parish church in the settlement is dedicated to Saint Nicholas and belongs to the Murska Sobota Diocese. The original parts of the church date to 1331, but it was expanded in the 16th century and in the late 18th century. It has a rectangular nave with a Gothic sanctuary and a belfry on its western facade.

Notable people
Notable people that were born or lived in Dolenci include:
 József Klekl Jr. (1879–1936), writer and journalist (parish priest in Dolenci, 1911–1936)
 Feri Lainšček (born 1959), writer, poet, and screenwriter
 Miska Magyarics (1825–1883), poet
 Ferenc Sbüll (1825–1864), poet

References

External links 
Dolenci on Geopedia

Populated places in the Municipality of Šalovci